German submarine U-469 was a Type VIIC U-boat of Nazi Germany's Kriegsmarine during World War II.

She carried out one patrol. She sank no ships.

She was sunk by a British aircraft south of Iceland on 25 March 1943.

Design
German Type VIIC submarines were preceded by the shorter Type VIIB submarines. U-469 had a displacement of  when at the surface and  while submerged. She had two shafts and two  propellers.

U-469 was fitted with five  torpedo tubes (four fitted at the bow and one at the stern), fourteen torpedoes, one  SK C/35 naval gun, 220 rounds, and one twin  C/30 anti-aircraft gun. The boat had a complement of between forty-four and sixty.

Service history
The submarine was laid down on 1 October 1941 at the Deutsche Werke in Kiel as yard number 300, launched on 8 August 1942 and commissioned on 7 October under the command of Oberleutnant zur See Emil Claussen.

She served with the 5th U-boat Flotilla from 7 October 1942 for training and the 3rd flotilla from 1 March 1943 for operations.

Patrol and loss
U-432s only patrol began with her departure from Kiel on 16 March 1943. She had just negotiated the gap between Iceland and the Faroe Islands, when she was sunk by a British B-17 Flying Fortress of No. 206 Squadron RAF – FK195/L, under Flight Lieutenant William Roxburgh – south of Iceland on the 25th.

Forty-seven men went down with U-469; there were no survivors.

References

Bibliography

External links

German Type VIIC submarines
U-boats commissioned in 1942
U-boats sunk in 1943
U-boats sunk by depth charges
U-boats sunk by British aircraft
1942 ships
Ships built in Kiel
Ships lost with all hands
World War II submarines of Germany
World War II shipwrecks in the Atlantic Ocean
Maritime incidents in March 1943